The 1972 Tulane Green Wave football team was an American football team that represented Tulane University during the 1972 NCAA University Division football season as an independent. In their second year under head coach Bennie Ellender, the team compiled a 6–5 record.

In Tulane's loss at Miami, the Hurricanes were erroneously awarded a fifth down late in the fourth quarter, helping them drive to the winning touchdown. The Southeastern Conference, which assigned the officials for the game, acknowledged the error, but it was too late to change the outcome. Nearly two months later, Tulane came up achingly short in its quest to end a 24-year winless streak vs. archrival LSU in the season finale. Trailing 9–3 with seconds remaining, Green Wave halfback Bill Huber took a swing pass in the flat and appeared headed to a touchdown, but he was stopped at the 1-yard line by Tiger safety Frank Racine after time ran out.

Schedule

Roster

References

Tulane
Tulane Green Wave football seasons
Tulane Green Wave football